Old Buddies is a Canadian drama film, directed by Claude Gagnon and released in 2020. The film stars Patrick Labbé as Pierrot, a man returning to his hometown of Saint-Hyacinthe, Quebec, following several years of living in Morocco, to visit his family and friends after being diagnosed with terminal lung cancer, and Paul Doucet as Pierrot's childhood friend Jacques, of whom Pierrot has a special request to help him end his life.

The cast also includes Luka Limoges, Marie-Pier Labrecque, Stéphan Côté, Luc Proulx, Natasha Kanapé Fontaine, Michel Olivier Girard, Geneviève Rochette and Pierre Curzi.

The film premiered on November 1, 2020 at the Abitibi-Témiscamingue International Film Festival, before premiering commercially on May 21, 2021.

References

External links
 

2020 films
2020 drama films
Canadian drama films
Films directed by Claude Gagnon
Films shot in Quebec
Films set in Quebec
2020s French-language films
French-language Canadian films
2020s Canadian films